is the 10th single by Japanese entertainer Miho Nakayama. Written by Shun Taguchi and Tetsuya Komuro, the single was released on July 7, 1987, by King Records.

Background and release
"50/50" was Nakayama's second collaboration with composer Komuro, after "Jingi Aishite Moraimasu". The lyrics were by Taguchi, who wrote three of Yoko Minamino's No. 1 hits. The song was arranged with Caribbean elements; most notably the use of steelpans.

"50/50" peaked at No. 2 on Oricon's weekly singles chart and sold over 211,000 copies.

Track listing

Charts
Weekly charts

Year-end charts

References

External links

1987 singles
1987 songs
Japanese-language songs
Miho Nakayama songs
Songs written by Tetsuya Komuro
King Records (Japan) singles